Picture Perfect is a 1997 American romantic comedy film directed by Glenn Gordon Caron, written by Arleen Sorkin, and starring Jennifer Aniston, Jay Mohr, Kevin Bacon, Illeana Douglas, Olympia Dukakis, and Anne Twomey. The film centers around a young advertising executive's life which becomes increasingly complicated when, in order to impress her boss, she pretends to be engaged to a man she just met. Picture Perfect was released on August 1, 1997, by 20th Century Fox. It received mixed reviews from critics and grossed $44.3 million against an $18 million budget.

Plot
Kate is struggling in the advertising business in New York City: she cannot move forward despite her talent. Her boss, Mr. Mercer, passes her up for a promotion because she is "not stable enough". Her co-worker, Darcy, invents a story claiming Kate is engaged to Nick, a freelance videographer who lives in Massachusetts, with whom Kate had her picture taken during a friend's wedding.

All seems to work out well for Kate and she gets her promotion, but after Nick saves a little girl from a fire and winds up in the news, Kate is asked to bring her alleged fiancé to dinner with Mercer and his wife. She goes to Boston to ask Nick to do it and to "break up" with her during the evening. Nick, who likes Kate, agrees to please Kate. Meanwhile, Sam, a colleague that Kate had always wanted, takes notice of her because she is engaged, and they have sex on two occasions.

Nick arrives in New York and stays at Kate's apartment, and as they get to know each other, she starts to like him. When they are out at the dinner with Mercer, Nick compliments Kate and expresses his desire for a future with her. Kate just wants their "fight" to happen, and after unsuccessfully trying to incite Nick at the dinner table, she pays a restaurant employee to call her mobile phone and makes out that Nick is having an affair with an ex-girlfriend. Nick figures it out and finally plays along. Next day, after his attempt to woo Kate fails, he returns to Boston.

A week later, Kate finds a special gift which Nick had left her, and it prompts her to admit the fake to Mercer and her co-workers, stating that she was dressing for the job she wanted (repeating a line that Mercer had used on her earlier regarding her instability). When she tells him she is quitting, Mercer admits how he had exaggerated his own past at one point in his life. He lets Kate keep her job, and suggests she take a few days off to go to see Nick.

Kate walks in while Nick is recording a church wedding and he rebuffs her attempts to patch things up, until she interrupts the ceremony at a crucial point. Watched by the entire wedding assembly, she apologizes for the way she treated him. He invites her to stay for the wedding reception and dinner afterwards, and they embrace, as the congregation applaud them.

Cast

Production
Academy Award winner Tom Fleischman is the re-recording mixer of the film. Picture Perfect also consists of other Academy Award nominees such as Les Lazarowitz, Jane Robinson, and Debra Schutt.

The movie was shot in June and July 1996.

Kaley Cuoco later revealed that "I was the last name in the credits (credited as ‘little girl’).. when I saw the movie, they had cut my one line".

Reception
On the review aggregator Rotten Tomatoes, the film has an approval rating of 47%, based on 43 reviews, with an average score of 5.4/10. On Metacritic it has a weighted average score of 44 out of 100, based on reviews from 16 critics, indicating "mixed or average reviews". Audiences surveyed by CinemaScore gave the film a grade "B−" on scale of A to F.

Roger Ebert found the film at odds with itself, noting how the script has poor storytelling elements but contains "nice dialogue touches" delivered by the characters, saying that "it's a shame the plot is so contrived, because parts of this [movie] are really pretty good." Janet Maslin of The New York Times called it a "light, undemanding comedy", commending its use of sitcom humor, bits of satire and the performances of Aniston, Douglas and Bacon, concluding that it "bounces busily among these players until it has to slow down and pretend to be sincere." Marc Savlov of The Austin Chronicle heavily criticized the film for having the aesthetics of "an over-long, over-nice, made-for-TV movie that goes nowhere quick." He gave notice to Aniston's performance lacking sustainability to capture the big screen, and bringing the rest of the main cast to her acting level.

Box office
The film opened at number 5 at the North American box office making $7.8 million in its opening weekend. It eventually earned over $44 million worldwide, against a budget of $18 million.

Soundtrack

References

External links

 
 

1997 films
1997 romantic comedy films
1990s American films
1990s English-language films
20th Century Fox films
American romantic comedy films
Films directed by Glenn Gordon Caron
Films scored by Carter Burwell
Films set in New York City